Andrus Johani (1 September 1906 – 18 August 1941) was an Estonian painter.

Johani was born in Tallinn and came of age as an artist with his friend Kaarel Liimand. They both painted and sketched scenes of daily life and traveled to the European art centers together, most notably Paris in 1937.

Since 1933 he was married to the librarian , who later served as a director of the National Library of Estonia during the Soviet occupation (then named State Library of the Estonian SSR).

He served in the defense of Tartu during WWII. He was taken prisoner by the Germans, and executed in the Tartu prison.

Gallery

References

External links

1906 births
1941 deaths
Artists from Tallinn
People from the Governorate of Estonia
20th-century Estonian painters
20th-century Estonian male artists
Estonian people of World War II
Estonian people executed by Nazi Germany